Real Club Deportivo Fabril, previously known as Deportivo B, is the reserve team of Real Club Deportivo de La Coruña, it is based in A Coruña, in the autonomous community of Galicia. It currently plays in Tercera División RFEF – Group 1, holding home games at Cidade Deportiva de Abegondo, with a capacity of 3,000 spectators.

History
The origins of Deportivo B can be found in 1914, when is Fabril Sociedad Deportiva is born. In 1963, after a merger with Club Deportivo Juvenil, it officially became the reserve team of Deportivo de La Coruña, being thus renamed Fabril Deportivo.

In 1994 the team was again renamed, this time as Deportivo de La Coruña B. It managed to play four consecutive years in the third division in the mid-90s and another two in the following decade, but competed mostly in the lower leagues.

On 10 July 2017, after its promotion to Segunda División B by defeating CP Cacereño in the promotion play-offs, Deportivo changed the name of the reserve team to Real Club Deportivo Fabril.

Season to season
 As Fabril SD

 As Fabril Deportivo

 As Deportivo de La Coruña's reserve team

11 seasons in Segunda División B
50 seasons in Tercera División
1 season in Tercera División RFEF

Current squad

Honours
Tercera División: 2005–06, 2006–07, 2009–10, 2016–17

References

External links
Official website 
Futbolme team profile 
Unofficial fansite 
Unofficial fansite #2 
Official international website

Deportivo de La Coruña
Spanish reserve football teams
Association football clubs established in 1994
1994 establishments in Spain
Football clubs in Galicia (Spain)